The County of Elphinstone is a cadastral division of Queensland which contains the city of Townsville.  It was named after George Elphinstone Dalrymple (1826–1876), a politician and explorer.   The county is divided into civil parishes. Townsville is mentioned as being in the county of Elphinstone in the 1911 Britannica. It is bounded by the Haughton River in the east, and part of the Burdekin River in the south-west.

Parishes
Elphinstone is divided into parishes, listed as follows:

References

Elphinstone

External links